Maarit is a Finnish female given name equivalent to Margaret. It may refer to:

Maarit Hurmerinta (born 1953), Finnish singer known by her mononym Maarit
Maarit Lalli (born 1964), Finnish film director, film producer and screenwriter
Maarit Toivanen (born 1954), Finnish business executive

See also
Marit

Finnish feminine given names